Alejandra Giraldo Preciado (born 9 April 1984) is a Colombian journalist, newscaster, and social commentator. She was born in Medellín, and graduated from the Pontifical Bolivarian University there.

Biography
Alejandra Giraldo has worked as a journalist for TV news channel Teleantioquia, then presented for subscription-based news channel Cable Noticias and worked for Canal Capital on the culinary program De buen gusto. After some time working for Cable Noticias, she left and now currently works as a newscaster alongside Jennifer Montoya at Noticias Caracol.

Citations

1984 births
Living people
Pontifical Bolivarian University alumni
Colombian women journalists
Colombian television presenters
Colombian women television presenters